Amritha Express() is a overnight express train operated by the Southern Railway zone of the Indian Railways between  in Kerala, and  in Tamil Nadu.

Background

This train is named after Mata Amritanandamayi, a well known spiritual leader.
,

History

It was first introduced as – Amritha Express, via .

On 5 May 2019, the link express from Nilambur Road was discontinued permanently, and both the trains ran as an independent train. Also Amritha Express was diverted to run via –– instead of Palakkad Junction–Shoranur Junction–Ottapalam–Thrissur. Therefore, Amritha Express will not touch Shoranur Junction, instead it will bypass Shoranur Junction.

Locomotive
Starting from September 24, 2022, this train will be converted from Diesel locomotive journey to a fully complete Electric locomotive journey since the Palakkad-Dindigul line got completely electrified and CRS Inspection was successfully completed.

Timings

This train is a daily service train with the following departures and arrivals at some of these stations:-

Coach Composition

 1 AC Two Tier,
 2 AC Three Tier,
 14 Sleeper class,
 3 General Unreserved,
 2 Luggage cum Disabled coach.

References

External links

Transport in Thiruvananthapuram
Named passenger trains of India
Express trains in India
Rail transport in Kerala
Railway services introduced in 2001